Tyquan is a masculine given name. Notable people with the name include:

 Tyquan Lewis (born 1995), American football defensive end
 Tyquan Thornton (born 2000), American football wide receiver

Masculine given names